Anna Ruth Lang is a recipient of the Canadian Cross of Valour.
 
On the ninth of September 1980 Anna Lang rescued two car passengers, named Lana and her four-year-old son, Jaye Walsh. At the entry of the Hammond River bridge a gasoline truck hit Mrs. Lang's car from behind and rammed it off the bridge and into the river. At that point the tanker fell into the river and exploded. The water was burning hot, and their car sank quickly. Lana was trying to swim to shore in her heavy clothes while holding her son. Suffering a concussion and under threat of spreading fire, Anna Lang swam to shore and removed her heavy clothing, and then returned to Lana and her son. Mrs Lang managed to reach Lana and Jaye Walsh and drag them to a safe distance from the fire and to shore. She suffered extreme burns during the rescue.

She was awarded the Cross of Valour, the highest ranking of the Canadian Bravery Decorations, one of 20 who has received the award since the award was established in 1972.

Two others who aided in the rescue from the shore, Jackie Chaisson and Erik Sparks, were awarded the Star of Courage, Canada's second-highest award for bravery.

See also
 Canadian Bravery Decorations

References

Recipients of the Cross of Valour (Canada)
Year of birth missing (living people)
Living people
Place of birth missing (living people)